The Thanage is a system of nobility, predating the modern Peerage in Scandinavia and the British Isles.

The basic title in the Thanage is the Thane, who in the Peerage is called a Baron.

Superior to the Thane is the Median-Thane, who in the Peerage is called a Count

Superior to the Median-Thane is the King`s Thane, who is a Prince.

The female titles are correspondingly Thaness, who is a Baroness.

Superior to the Thaness is the Median-Thaness, who is a Countess.

Superior to the Median-Thaness, is the King`s Thaness who is a Princess.

 
Thanage thus denote the rank held by such a thegn.

In medieval Scotland David I, an Anglophile, introduced "thanes" to replace the Gaelic "tòiseach".

Therefore, Scottish thanage denotes the land and duties held and undertaken by the thanes.

Anglo-Saxon thegns